The Blancan North American Stage on the geologic timescale is the North American  faunal stage according to the North American Land Mammal Ages chronology (NALMA), typically set from 4,750,000 to 1,806,000 years BP, a period of .  It is usually considered to start in the early-mid Pliocene Epoch and end by the early Pleistocene.  The Blancan is preceded by the Hemphillian and followed by the Irvingtonian NALMA stages.

As usually defined, it corresponds to the mid-Zanclean through Piacenzian and Gelasian stages in Europe and Asia. In California, the Blancan roughly corresponds to the mid-Delmontian through Repettian and Venturian to the very early Wheelerian. The Australian contemporary stages are the mid-Cheltenhamian through Kalimnan and Yatalan. In New Zealand, the Opoitian starts at roughly the same time and the Blancan is further coeval with the Waipipian and Mangapanian stages to the early Nukumaruan. Finally, in Japan the Blancan starts coeval with the late Yuian, runs alongside the Totomian and Suchian and ends soon after the start of the Kechienjian.

Dating issues
The start date of the Blancan has not been fully established. There is general agreement that it is between 4.9 and 4.3 mya (million years ago). The often-cited GeoWhen database places it at 4.75 mya.

There is even stronger disagreement about the end of the Blancan. Some stratigraphers argue for the 1.808 mya date that corresponds better with the end of the Pliocene and the start of the Pleistocene (1.808 mya).  This conforms with the extinction of Borophagus, Hypolagus, Paenemarmota, Plesippus, Nannippus, and Rhynchotherium faunal assemblage between 2.2 and 1.8 mya. Other paleontologists find continuity of the faunal assemblages well into the Pleistocene, and argue for an end date of 1.2 mya.  This corresponds with the extinction of stegomastodons and related species and the appearance of mammoths in southern North America.

Fauna
The middle of the Blancan, about 2.7 mya, is when the land bridge connection between North and South America was reestablished and taxa like sloths and glyptodonts appeared in North America at the height of the Great American Interchange.

<div float="left">

Notable mammals
Artiodactyla – even-toed ungulates
 Platygonus, peccaries
Carnivora – carnivores
Arctotherium?, giant short-faced bear
Hesperocyoninae, dog-like carnivores
 Borophagus, bone-crushing dogs
Canis, wolves
 Chasmaporthetes, hyenas
Smilodon, saber-toothed cat
Homotherium, saber-toothed cat
Xenosmilus, saber-toothed cat
Lagomorpha – lagomorphs
 Hypolagus, rabbits
Perissodactyla – odd-toed ungulates
 Nannippus, horses
 Plesippus, horses – may belong into Equus
 equus giganteus
Proboscidea
 Rhynchotherium, gomphotheres
 Stegomastodon, gomphotheres
Rodentia – rodents
 Paenemarmota, giant marmots

Notable birds
Cathartidae – New World vultures
 Sarcoramphus kernense, Kern Vulture
Charadriiformes
 unknown scolopacid (archaic calidrid or turnstone?)
Falconiformes – diurnal raptors
 Falco sp., a falcon
Passeriformes
 unknown corvid (archaic magpie?)

</div>

 See also 
 Mount Blanco

 References 

Further reading
Lourens, L. et al. (2004): The Neogene Period. In: Gradstein, F.; Ogg, J. & Smith, A.G. (eds.): A Geologic Time Scale 2004''. Cambridge University Press. 

 
Pleistocene life
Pliocene life
Zanclean
Piacenzian
Calabrian (stage)
Pliocene animals of North America
Pleistocene animals of North America
Cenozoic Texas
Pliocene United States
Pleistocene United States